Gesa is a given name. Notable people with the name include:

Gesa Ederberg (born 1968), German rabbi
Gesa Felicitas Krause (born 1992), German athlete
Gesa Hansen (born 1981), German-Danish designer
Gesa Weyhenmeyer (born 1969), Swedish limnologist

See also
Gese (disambiguation)